Sacred Mother Tongue was a four-piece British heavy metal band from Northampton initially formed in 2004. The line up consisted of Darrin South (vocals), Andy James (guitar), Josh Gurner (bass guitar) and Lee Newell (drums). In October 2013, the band decided to split up, citing an inability to reach a larger audience.

In 2020, guitarist Andy James joined Five Finger Death Punch as their lead guitarist, replacing long time member Jason Hook.

Discography

Albums 
 Revenge Is Personal (2006)
 The Ruin of Man (2009)
 A Light Shines (2012)
 Out of the Darkness (2013)

Singles 
 The End
 Two Thousand Eight Hundred
 Seven
 Evolve/Become
 А Light Will Shine

Music videos

Members 
 Andy James – guitars 
 Darrin South – vocals 
 Lee Newell – drums 
 Josh Gurner – bass guitar 
 Craig Daws – bass guitar

References

External links 
 transcendmusic.com
 Sacred Mother Tongue official website
 A Light Shines EP information
 Sacred Mother Tongue on Facebook

British heavy metal musical groups